Cat & Mouse is a 1958 British crime drama film directed by Paul Rotha. It was released in the United States with the alternative title The Desperate Men.

Synopsis

A deserter from the American army holds a young British woman hostage, believing she knows the location of a fortune in diamonds.

Cast
 Lee Patterson as Rod Fenner
 Ann Sears as Ann Coltby
 Victor Maddern as Superintendent Harding
 Hilton Edwards as Mr. Scruby
 Diana Fawcett as Mrs. Pomeroy
 Roddy McMillan as Mr. Pomeroy
 Stuart Saunders as Plainclothes Sergeant
 George Rose as Second-hand Clothes Dealer
 Llewellyn Rees as	Bank Manager

References

External links

1958 films
British crime drama films
Films directed by Paul Rotha
Films based on British novels
1958 crime drama films
British black-and-white films
1950s English-language films
1950s British films